Chhatral is a town in Gandhinagar district  in the state of Gujarat, India. Chhatral INA is an Industrial Notified Area located next to Chhatral.

Demographics
 India census, Chhatral had a population of 10,215. Males constitute 53% of the population and females 47%. Chhatral has an average literacy rate of 85.5%, with male literacy of 92.6% and female literacy of 77.3%. 13.5% of the population is under 6 years of age.

References

Cities and towns in Gandhinagar district